Japanese Voyeurs was a British band from London, England, formed in 2007 consisting of Romily Alice, Johnny Seymour, Tom Lamb, Rikki Waldron and Steve Wilson.

The band's first release was Sicking and Creaming, a 2009 EP. In 2010, they released the double A-side of "That Love Sound" and "Blush". In March 2011, they flew to Vancouver, British Columbia, Canada, to record their debut album, Yolk, with Garth Richardson. They released  Yolk on 11 July 2011. In July 2011, they opened for Slash at a number of concerts.

On 8 March 2012, the band split up, stating on their Facebook page that 'we simply can't afford to keep doing the band'. Drummer Steve Wilson left to join Hawk Eyes and bassist Johnny Seymour joined Dinosaur Pile-Up.

Band members
 Johnny Seymour - bass
 Rikki Waldron - keyboard
 Romily Alice - vocals, guitar
 Steve Wilson - drums
 Tom Lamb - guitar

Discography

EPs
 Sicking and Creaming (2009)

Albums
 Yolk (2011)
 B-Sides and Rarities (2012)

Singles
 "Smother Me" (2010)
 "Milk Teeth" (2010)
 "That Love Sound" / "Blush" (2010)
 "Get Hole" (2011)
 "Cry Baby" (2011)

References

British alternative metal musical groups
English alternative rock groups
Fiction Records artists
Musical groups from London
Musical groups established in 2007
Musical groups disestablished in 2012